The State of Han was a minor state that existed during the Western Zhou dynasty and early Spring and Autumn period, and centered on modern day Hancheng and Hejin. The state was created for a son, known historically as the Marquess of Han (韓侯), of King Wu of Zhou in 11th century BC. The rulers held the rank of marquess and ancestral name of Ji (姬). Han was conquered by the State of Jin and enfeoffed to Wuzi of Han, who was a descendant of Marquis Mu of Jin, in 8th century BC.

References

Ancient Chinese states
Zhou dynasty